Uyenanao Lake is a glacial lake on the Mistik Creek chain, approximately  northeast of Bakers Narrows. It is part of the Nelson River watershed, in the Hudson Bay drainage basin in the Northern Region of Manitoba, Canada. The surrounding mixed deciduous and coniferous forest is part of the Churchill River Upland portion of the Midwestern Canadian Shield forests. The region around the lake consists of rocky parallel ridges with poorly drained areas of muskeg and irregular stony shorelines due to intense glaciation. The lake is situated on the well known "Mistik Creek Loop", a remote canoe route  in length which can be paddled in four days.

Uyenanao means 'eight' in Cree, as all of the fourteen lakes on Mistik Creek are named in numeric order in Cree.

See also
List of lakes of Manitoba

References

Lakes of Northern Manitoba
Glacial lakes of Manitoba